FDY may refer to:
 Findlay Airport, serving Findlay, Ohio, United States
 Southern Airways Express, an American airline
 Sun Air Express, a defunct American airline